The Playing-Card is a quarterly publication, publishing scholarly articles covering all aspects of playing cards and of the games played with them, produced by the International Playing-Card Society. The Playing-Card'''s articles are mostly in English, but also in French, German, Italian, and Spanish.

History
The journal was founded in 1972, as The Journal of the Playing-Card Society'' (until 1980). Since then it has produced an annual volume of four (formerly six) issues. It has an index of its articles for the years 1972–1997, and contents listings for issues from 1980 to the present.

References

External links
WorldCat Record

Card game magazines
Magazines established in 1972
Multilingual magazines
Playing cards
Quarterly magazines published in the United Kingdom